Neil Nunes (born 12 December 1980) (pronounced  ) is a British-Jamaican continuity announcer and newsreader on BBC Radio 4 in the United Kingdom, and on the BBC World Service.

Early life
Nunes was born in Kingston, Jamaica, and brought up in the parish of Manchester in the west-central part of the island.

Career
While studying for a degree in biology at Northern Caribbean University, Nunes became involved with the university radio station as a presenter. He went on to work as a newsreader and reporter for radio networks in the Dutch Caribbean, while at the same time serving as a correspondent for the BBC Caribbean Service. He studied as a postgraduate at the London School of Journalism.

He began working as a freelance announcer on BBC Radio 4 in 2006. Initially he suffered criticism for his strong Caribbean accent, but was robustly defended by listeners on the programme Feedback. He is now a well-established announcer, and since November 2017 also reads the news.

Nunes joined the BBC World Service as a producer and presenter of current affairs programmes. He also reads world news bulletins on the World Service in addition to his Radio 4 continuity work. He also features as "Narrator" on Twirlywoos. His style of delivery is parodied by Jon Culshaw on Dead Ringers.

References

External links 
 Neil Nunes on Twitter
 David Smith, "Now on Radio 4, a change of programme ... a row about accents", The Observer, 26 March 2006.
 Terry Kirby, "Voice from Jamaica divides Radio 4 listeners", The Independent, 31 March 2006.
 Rachel Cooke, "I think of Radio 4 as a kind of club – but I don’t much like some of the other members", New Statesman, 10 April 2006.

1980 births
Alumni of London South Bank University
Alumni of the London School of Journalism
BBC Radio 4
BBC World Service people
Living people
Radio and television announcers
Jamaican emigrants to the United Kingdom